Glenside Hospital refers to multiple institutions:
 Glenside Hospital (Adelaide), former institution in Glenside, South Australia
 Glenside Hospital (Bristol), former institution on what is now the Glenside, Bristol campus of the University of the West of England